The 2012–13 Slovenian First League was the 22nd season of the 1. A liga, Slovenia's premier handball league.

Teams information

Regular season

Standings

Pld - Played; W - Won; L - Lost; PF - Points for; PA - Points against; Diff - Difference; Pts - Points.

Championship play-offs

Standings

Pld - Played; W - Won; L - Lost; PF - Points for; PA - Points against; Diff - Difference; Pts - Points.

Results
In the table below the home teams are listed on the left and the away teams along the top.

Relegation round

Pld - Played; W - Won; L - Lost; PF - Points for; PA - Points against; Diff - Difference; Pts - Points.

References

External links
Scoresway

Handball competitions in Slovenia
2012–13 domestic handball leagues
2012 in Slovenian sport
2013 in Slovenian sport